Bistolida erythraeensis, the Red Sea cowry,  is a species of sea snail, a cowry, a marine gastropod mollusk in the family Cypraeidae, the cowries.

Description
The shell surface is smooth and shiny. The dorsum is grey or pale bluish with small brown irregular blotches and spots, one or more trasversal bands and two brown spots at each end, while the base is whitish-grey with several brown spots. The shape of these shells is elongated oval, the aperture is long and narrow, outer and inner lips have fine teeth, with a tongue-shaped radula. In the living cowry the mantle and the foot are well developed, usually with external antennae. The mantle is thin, transparent and greyish-white, with many white papillae and covers almost entirely the shell.

Distribution
This species can be found in the Red Sea, and the seas along Aden, Eritrea, Somalia, Tanzania and Zanzibar.

Habitat
They fear daylight and feed at dawn or dusk on algae, sponges, coral polyps and small crustaceans.

References

External links
 Seashell
 
 Rbridges
 Flmnh
 WoRMS
 Xenophora

Cypraeidae
Gastropods described in 1837